Waikerie Airport  is located  east of the town of Waikerie in the locality of Holder, South Australia.

The flat dry terrain in the area provides good thermals for gliding. The airport is home to the Waikerie Gliding Club. Waikerie hosted the 14th World Gliding Championships in 1974.

See also
 List of airports in South Australia

References

External links
 Waikerie Airport at the Loxton/Waikerie District Council

Airports in South Australia